Thomas Kelsey (died c. 1680) rose from obscurity as a "London tradesman" to become an important figure in the government of Oliver Cromwell.

Kelsey enlisted in the New Model Army and fought on the side of Parliament during the English Civil War, displaying a zeal that led him to become a major-general in 1645. He became a lieutenant-colonel in Colonel Ingoldsby's regiment from 1646. After the war he was elected as Deputy-Governor of Oxford, and in 1651 he was further appointed a lieutenant of Dover Castle.

As a member of the 'fifth Monarchist congregation' in London, led by John Simpson, during the early 1650s, he supported Oliver Cromwell in the establishment of the Protectorate and was elected MP for Sandwich in Kent for the First Protectorate Parliament, and was appointed the Major-General for Surrey and Kent during the Rule of the Major-Generals.

Thomas Kelsey was returned for Dover during the Second Protectorate Parliament, when he supported John Desborough's move to establish the Major-Generals as a permanent form of government.

After the collapse of the Protectorate in 1659, Thomas Kelsey supported John Lambert's attempts to resist the Restoration. Major-General Kelsey was deprived of his commands under the recalled Rump Parliament (Jan 1660), and was ordered to leave London. With the return of King Charles II in May 1660, Kelsey felt safer removing himself to the Netherlands, but with others including John Desborough was instructed to return to England in 1666.

Thereafter little more is known of his life, except that it has been suggested he turned his skills to becoming a brewer, and that he died around 1680.

References
 

Year of birth unknown
1680s deaths
Fifth Monarchists
Lords Warden of the Cinque Ports
Roundheads
Members of the Parliament of England for Dover
English MPs 1654–1655
English MPs 1656–1658